Lasiocercis subbigibboides is a species of beetle in the family Cerambycidae. It was described by Stephan von Breuning in 1971.

References

Lasiocercis
Beetles described in 1971